Sherang Rang-e Murzard (also Romanized as Sherāng Rang-e Mūrzard; also known as Sherang Rang) is a village in Margown Rural District, Margown District, Boyer-Ahmad County, Kohgiluyeh and Boyer-Ahmad Province, Iran. At the 2006 census, its population was 90, in 20 families.

References 

Populated places in Boyer-Ahmad County